The 1978 Kentucky Wildcats football team represented the University of Kentucky in the Southeastern Conference (SEC) during the 1978 NCAA Division I-A football season.  In their sixth season under head coach Fran Curci, the Wildcats compiled a 4–6–1 record (2–4 against SEC opponents), finished in a tie for seventh place in the SEC, and outscored their opponents, 193 to 189.  The team played its home games in Commonwealth Stadium in Lexington, Kentucky.

The team's statistical leaders included Larry McCrimmon with 752 passing yards, Fred Williams with 313 rushing yards, and Felix Wilson with 727 receiving yards. Kentucky began the year ranked 17th, but fell out of the polls after week one.

Schedule

References

Kentucky
Kentucky Wildcats football seasons
Kentucky Wildcats football